San Ignacio or San Ignacio de Piaxtla is a city and seat of the  surrounding San Ignacio Municipality in the Mexican state of Sinaloa.

In this town actress Ofelia Cano was born.

The municipality reported 4,543 inhabitants in the 2010 census.

External links
http://www.sinaloa.gob.mx/conociendo/municipios/sanignacio.htm

Populated places in Sinaloa
Populated places established in 1633
1633 establishments in the Spanish Empire